French Kiss is a 1995 romantic comedy film directed by Lawrence Kasdan and starring Meg Ryan and Kevin Kline. Written by Adam Brooks, the film is about a woman who flies to France to confront her straying fiancé and gets into trouble when the charming crook seated next to her uses her to smuggle a stolen diamond necklace. French Kiss was filmed on location in Paris, the Provence-Alpes-Côte d'Azur région of southeastern France, and Cannes. The film was released in the United States on May 5, 1995, and received mixed reviews. The film was a success and went on to earn a total worldwide gross of $101,982,854.

A Hindi remake of the film named Pyaar To Hona Hi Tha was released on July 24, 1998. The 2004 Malayalam comedy film Vettam was also based on French Kiss.

It was the last movie to be shot by cinematographer Owen Roizman before his death in 2023

Plot
Kate, a fastidious, wholesome American, history teacher, lives in Canada with her fiancé, Charlie, a doctor. While waiting for her Canadian citizenship to come through, Kate has been planning their wedding and the purchase of their first house, complete with a white picket fence.

When Charlie urges her to accompany him to Paris for an upcoming conference, she declines due to her fear of flying and her general intolerance for cheese, secondhand smoke, and the stereotypical idea she has about the French.

A few days later, Kate's plans for the future are crushed when she receives a phone call from Charlie, who tells her he has fallen in love with a French "goddess" named Juliette and he will not be returning. Determined to win him back, Kate boards an Air Canada flight to Paris and is seated next to a Frenchman, Luc Teyssier, whose every word annoys her.

Unknown to Kate, Luc is smuggling a vine cutting and a stolen diamond necklace into France, hoping to use both to start his own vineyard. With the help of a few drinks, Kate is able to tolerate her "rude" and "nicotine saturated and hygiene-deficient" seating partner long enough to arrive safely in Paris. Before deboarding, Luc sneaks the vine and necklace into Kate's bag, knowing she will not be searched at customs.

At the terminal, Luc is spotted by Inspector Jean-Paul Cardon, who insists on giving him a ride during which he searches his bag. Jean-Paul knows of Luc's vocation, but feels "protective" of him as Luc once saved his life. Meanwhile, Kate arrives at the Hôtel George V, where she encounters new levels of French sarcasm and rudeness from the concierge.

While waiting in the lobby with petty thief Bob, Kate sees Charlie and Juliette kissing passionately in a descending elevator and faints. Bob steals her bag and leaves just as Luc arrives. After reviving Kate, Luc realizes who has the necklace, goes with Kate to Bob's apartment, and recovers the bag, absent her money and passport.

Upset with Luc, Kate heads off on her own, and learns that Charlie is traveling south to Cannes to meet Juliette's parents. Luc, meanwhile, realizes the necklace must still be in Kate's bag. He tracks her down to the train station, offers to help her "win back Charlie", and together they board a train to Cannes. That evening, Luc sees Charlie's picture from Kate's locket before she falls asleep. While she sleeps, he tries to check Kate's bag during which she, thinking it's Charlie, kisses him.

The next morning during breakfast, she describes it as a 'delicious dream' with which she woke up 'transformed,' only to sample some of the 452 official government cheeses of France, despite being lactose intolerant. She gets an upset stomach shortly after and is violently ill, and they get off the train at Luc's hometown of La Ravelle in Paulhaguet, where they stay at his family home and vineyard. Kate learns about Luc's past and how he gambled away his vineyard birthright to his brother in a single hand of poker; she also learns that while he may be a schemer, he knows a lot about wine, and dreams of someday buying land for his own winery. As they board the train to Cannes, Kate shows him that she, in fact, has the necklace.

At Cannes, they check into a room at the Carlton Hotel using a stolen credit card. Following Luc's advice, Kate confronts Charlie in front of Juliette on the beach, pretending to be indifferent to him. To make him jealous, Luc pretends to be Kate's lover, and it works. Later that afternoon, Jean-Paul approaches Kate, urging her to convince Luc to return the necklace anonymously to avoid jail. Luc was planning to sell the necklace at Cartier, but agrees to Kate's "new plan" to have her sell the necklace, as that would be safer.

At dinner, Charlie apologizes to Kate and accompanies her to her room, where he tries to seduce her. Rejecting his advances, Kate realizes she no longer wants him, as she has fallen in love with Luc. Meanwhile, in an effort to "ensure victory" for her, Luc takes an all-too-willing Juliette to bed, seducing her, but his plan fails when he calls her "Kate".

The following morning, Kate tells Luc that Charlie wants her back, but quickly leaves the room, saying, "Cartier is waiting". She returns the necklace to Jean-Paul and purchases a Cartier check for $45,782 with her own savings to create the illusion that she sold it. After giving the check to Luc, she leaves for the airport pretending to meet Charlie. Soon after, Jean-Paul approaches Luc and reveals the charade and all that Kate has done for him. Luc rushes to the airport, boards the plane, and confesses his love for her and wants her to stay with him. Sometime later, Kate and he kiss and embrace in their beautiful new vineyard.

Cast

 Meg Ryan as Kate
 Kevin Kline as Luc Teyssier
 Timothy Hutton as Charlie Lytton
 Jean Reno as Inspector Jean-Paul Cardon
 François Cluzet as Bob
 Susan Anbeh as Juliette
 Marie-Christine Adam as Juliette's mother
 Jean-Paul Jaupart as Juliette's father
 Renee Humphrey as Lilly
 Michael Riley as M. Campbell
  as Concierge
  as Octave
  as Claire
 Julie Leibowitch as Olivia
 Miquel Brown as Sgt. Patton
 Claudio Todeschini as Antoine Teyssier
 Jerry Harte as Herb
 Thomasine Heiner as mom
 Barbara Schulz as a pouting girl
 Clément Sibony as a pouting boy
 Adam Brooks as Perfect Passenger
 Patrice Juiff as French Customs Official
 Jean Corso as Hotel George V Desk's clerk
 François-Xavier Tilmant as hotel waiter
 Williams Diols as beach waiter
 Mike Johns as Lucien
 Ghislaine Juillot as Jean-Paul Cardon's wife
 Alain Frérot as Old Man

Production

Pre-production
The lead role of Luc was originally written for Gérard Depardieu, but Kevin Kline accepted the role when Depardieu was not available for the film.

Filming
Principal photography took place from September 17 to December 22, 1994. French Kiss was filmed primarily in Paris, the Alpes-Maritimes department in the Provence-Alpes-Côte d'Azur region of southeastern France, and Cannes.

In Paris, scenes were shot at the Hotel George V, where Kate has her encounters with the supercilious concierge. The hotel lobby was used for the scene where the petty thief Bob steals Kate's bag after she faints. Several scenes show the Eiffel Tower in the background—the one site Kate longs to see most but keeps on missing. A phonebooth on Champs-Élysées near the Arc de Triomphe was used for the scene where Kate calls Charlie's mother. Scenes were also filmed at the American Embassy at 2 Avenue Gabriel, and the Canadian Embassy at 35 Avenue Montaigne. The scene where Luc throws money on the sidewalk was filmed at the corner of rue Paul-Albert and rue Feutrier in Montmartre.

Driving scenes in Paris were filmed in front of the Louvre near the Louvre Pyramid, along the Rive Droite, and on Rue des Rosiers, where Luc drives down a narrow, winding cobblestoned street. Additional Paris scenes were filmed at the Sacré-Cœur in Montmartre, the Grande Pharmacie de la Place Blanche at 5 Place Blanche, the Palais de Chaillot, and Place des Abbesses, where Kate and Luc discuss his "little problem". The final scene filmed in Paris was at the Gare Saint-Lazare train station, where Luc is chased by Inspector Jean-Paul Cardon while trying to board a train south to Cannes.

In the Provence-Alpes-Côte d'Azur region, the small village of Valbonne, about fifteen minutes north of Cannes, was used for several scenes, including the scene where Luc fights with his brother in the main village square in front of the Hotel les Armoiries, an old seventeenth century building. Other scenes were filmed at the train station and nearby vineyards around La Ravelle, 84240 La Tour-d'Aigues, The train station near Meyrargues, Bouches-du-Rhône, was also used in one scene.

In Cannes, several exterior shots of the Carlton Hotel were used to represent where the four main characters stay. There are interior scenes of the lobby and the brasserie used for morning breakfasts. Other scenes filmed here include the beach in front of the hotel along with the adjacent waterfront—in particular the Cartier boutique on the next corner. The grape harvest scenes were filmed at Château Val Joanis in Pertuis, Vaucluse. Studio scenes were shot at Paris Studios Cinéma.

Title
The film was originally titled Paris Match, a play on the name of the famous French newsmagazine. However, the title had to be changed after Billy Crystal challenged it with the MPAA as being too close to that of his own Paris-set romantic comedy Forget Paris, released just two weeks later.

Soundtrack
The French Kiss Original Soundtrack album was released by Mercury Records on CD on May 9, 1995. It peaked at 170 on the Billboard 200.

Release

Critical response
French Kiss was released in United States on May 5, 1995, and received mixed reviews. In his review in the San Francisco Chronicle, Mick LaSalle wrote that director Lawrence Kasdan "takes what could have been a fluffy comedy with lots of plot complications and picturesque scenery and instead puts his focus on the important things: on the characters played by Ryan and Kline and how they happen to be feeling." LaSalle also applauded Kasdan's sense of subtle comedy:

LaSalle found Kline's performance "extraordinary" and that he not only perfected the accent but the "speech rhythms and the manner as well." LaSalle also praised Ryan's comic timing, which "continues to delight."

In her review in The Washington Post, Rita Kempley, giving it a mixed review, wrote that the film "isn't as passionate as the title suggests—in fact, it's facile—but Ryan and Kevin Kline, as her attractive opposite, are irresistible together." Kempley applauded the acting performances:

In his review in the Chicago Sun-Times, a disappointed Roger Ebert wrote, "The characters in this movie may look like adults, but they think like teenagers." Although he acknowledged that the film was not without its charms—Paris and Cannes being "two of the most photogenic cities on earth"—Ebert concluded, "Kline's Frenchman is somehow not worldly enough, and Ryan's heroine never convinces us she ever loved her fiancé in the first place."

In her review in The New York Times, Janet Maslin called the film a "romantic comedy with barely a laugh or a spark, and with a pace that makes it feel longer than Mr. Kasdan's previous work, Wyatt Earp."

Review aggregation website Rotten Tomatoes gave the film a score of 48% based on reviews from 27 critics with a weighted average of 5.6/10. The consensus summarizes: "French Kiss is effervescent like good champagne but its spirit fizzles in a film that isn't as intoxicating as its stars."

Box office
The film earned $38,896,854 in the United States and an additional $63,086,000 in international markets for a total worldwide gross of $101,982,854.

Accolades

The film is recognized by American Film Institute in these lists:
 2002: AFI's 100 Years...100 Passions – Nominated

Home media
French Kiss was released in United States on video on February 6, 1996. It was released in DVD format by 20th Century Fox on January 18, 2000, and in Blu-ray format by 20th Century Fox on January 8, 2013.

it is unavailable on any streaming platform as of February, 2023.

Notes

References

External links
 
 
 
 

1995 films
1995 romantic comedy films
American romantic comedy films
British romantic comedy films
1990s English-language films
Films scored by James Newton Howard
Films directed by Lawrence Kasdan
Films produced by Eric Fellner
Films produced by Tim Bevan
Films set in Cannes
Films set in France
Films shot in France
Films shot in Paris
1990s French-language films
20th Century Fox films
PolyGram Filmed Entertainment films
Working Title Films films
1995 multilingual films
American multilingual films
British multilingual films
1990s American films
1990s British films